The twenty-second season of British science fiction television series Doctor Who began on 5 January 1985 and ended on 30 March 1985. It opened with the serial Attack of the Cybermen and ended with the serial Revelation of the Daleks. The season returned to the traditional Saturday transmission for the first time since Season 18, but for the first and only time in the classic series' first run it featured 45-minute episodes in its entirety. During transmission, BBC One controller Michael Grade announced an 18-month hiatus for the series, partly citing the violence depicted in the stories of the season. John Nathan-Turner produced the series, with Eric Saward script editing.

Casting

Main cast 
 Colin Baker as the Sixth Doctor
 Nicola Bryant as Peri Brown
 Patrick Troughton as the Second Doctor
 Frazer Hines as Jamie McCrimmon

Colin Baker and Nicola Bryant continue their roles as the Sixth Doctor and Peri Brown.

Patrick Troughton and Frazer Hines return to play the Second Doctor and his companion Jamie McCrimmon in The Two Doctors. Their last on-screen appearance was (briefly in the case of Hines) The Five Doctors in 1983.

Recurring actors 
 Anthony Ainley as The Master
 Kate O'Mara as the Rani
 Terry Molloy as Davros

Anthony Ainley returns in The Mark of the Rani as The Master.

Kate O'Mara makes her first appearance as the Rani in The Mark of the Rani.

Terry Molloy returns to play Davros in Revelation of the Daleks and also played Russell in Attack of the Cybermen.

Guest stars
Maurice Colbourne returned as Lytton from the story Resurrection of the Daleks in Attack of the Cybermen.

David Banks makes his third of four appearances as a Cyber-leader in Attack of the Cybermen.

Michael Kilgarriff reprises his role of the Cyber-Controller from The Tomb of the Cybermen (1967).

Serials 

The series moved back to once-weekly Saturday broadcasts. All episodes were 45 minutes long, though they also exist in 25-minute versions. Although there were now only 13 episodes in the season, the total running time remained approximately the same as in previous seasons since the episodes were almost twice as long.

Supplemental episodes
A specially written segment produced for the BBC children's programme Jim'll Fix It featuring Colin Baker in character as the Sixth Doctor. It was broadcast on 23 February 1985. It is not generally considered to be canonical by Doctor Who fans (although a book in the Big Finish Short Trips series nevertheless features a sequel to it).

Home media

VHS releases

DVD and Blu-ray releases

In print

References

Bibliography

 

1985 British television seasons
Season 22
Season 22
22